Codium harveyi is a species of seaweed in the Codiaceae family.

In Western Australia is found along the coast in the Gascoyne and Mid West regions extending along the south coast and along the east coast of New South Wales and the north coast of Tasmania. It is also widespread throughout the Indian and Pacific Oceans.

References

harveyi
Plants described in 1956